Wijdan Al-Sayegh (Arabic: وجدان الصائغ) is an Iraqi writer, poet, and critic born in Baghdad in 1967. She earned a master's degree with a grade of excellence in 1992 from University of Mosul on her thesis (the Rhetorical image in the poetry of Omar Abu Risha). Local and Arabic magazines have published tens of her poetry and studies and she is currently the managing editor of the New Poetry Magazine – Middle Eastern studies department in Michigan, United States.

Early life 
The Iraqi poet, writer, and critic Wijdan Al-Sayegh was born in Baghdad in 1967. She earned a master's degree with a grade of excellence in 1992 from University of Mosul on her thesis (the Rhetorical image in the poetry of Omar Abu Risha). She also earned a doctorate degree from the same university in rhetorical criticism in 1995 on her dissertation (Imagery in the poetry of al-Akhtal al-Saghir). She also earned a diploma in media studies in 2001 from the University of Colorado in the United States. Al-Sayegh started teaching in 1992 and supervised numerous M.A theses of which the last were Character Portrayal in Muhammed al-Shurafi’s Literature, Heritage in the Poetry of Hassan al-Sharafi, and the Poetry of Umara al-Yamani: A Stylistic Reading, College of Arts, Thamar University, 2005–2006. Arabic and local magazines published tens of her poems and studies, and she is currently the managing editor of the New Poetry Magazine and the Arabic Journal – middle eastern studies department in Michigan, United States. She was a member of the evaluative committee of the President of Yemen's Prize for Poetry for the years 2004, 2005, and 2006 and a member of the Al Owais Cultural Award for Poetry committee in the years 2015 and 2016.

Works 

 The Rhetorical Image in the Poetry of Omar Abu Risha, Dar al-Hayat, 1997. 
 The Rhetorical Image in Feminist Texts from the United Arab Emirates, the Egyptian-Lebanese Corporation, 1999
 The Sparkle of Creation and the Hearth of Disclosure: Readings in Contemporary Texts, Ubadi Foundation for Studies and Publication, Sana’a, 2001 
 The Lotus Flower: Readings in the Poeticism of Ali Abdullah Khalifa, Dar El Ilm Lilmalayin, 2002
 The Rhetorical Image in Modern Arabic Poetry, Arab Foundation for Studies and Publication, Beirut, 2003
 The Throne and the Hoopoe: Exegetical Analogies of Images in Yemeni Poetic Discourse, Al-Afif Foundation, Sana’a, 2003
 Feminist Scriptures: Readings in Feminist Texts, Union of Yemeni Writers, Sana’a, 2003
 The Female and the Mirrors of the Text: Arabic Feminist Literature, Ninawa House, Damascus, 2004 
 Poets from Dilmun, Ministry of Culture, Sana’a, 2004
 The Poem and the Interpretative Space, Ministry of Culture, Sana’a, 2004
 The Feminist Arabic Poem: Reading through the Disciplines, Ministry of Culture, Sana’a, 2005 
 Arabic Feminist Narrative: Reading through the Disciplines, Ubadi Foundation, Sana’a, 2006
 The Carbuncle Rose: The Formation of Misery in the Contemporary Poem, Ubadi Foundation, 2006
 The Swallow and the Spring: Readings in Yemeni Poetry, Dhamar University Press, Dhamar, 2006
 Pearl Necklaces: Readings in the Contemporary Poem, Aden University Press, Aden, 2006

Awards 

 Laureate of Women's Literary Creation, Sharjah, November 1998, for her book the Rhetorical Image in Feminist Texts from the United Arab Emirates
 Al-Afif Cultural Award for Literature, Sana’a, April 2003, for her book the Throne and the Hoopoe: Exegetical Analogies of Images in Yemeni Poetic Discourse
 Her book The Lotus Flower was selected for distribution at the Bahraini Cultural Forum in its new location, January, 2002
 She got awarded the Testimonial Plaque of the Mu’assasat al-Muthaqqaf al-‘Arabi for her career as a critic, Cairo, 2004

References 

1967 births
Living people
Iraqi women academics
Iraqi writers
Iraqi critics